Hossein Rajabian (born 5 July 1984) is an Iranian filmmaker, writer and photographer who was imprisoned as a political prisoner in 2015 on charges related to his filmmaking. He as an anti-censorship filmmaker and defender of freedom of speech for the arts, has been elected as an honorary member of the SRF (La Société des réalisateurs de films) in France in 2021.

Artistic activities 
Hossein Rajabian started off his artistic career in a theater school. Later he made his debut in cinema by making and editing short and documentary films. His artistic résumé is dotted with different projects ranging from making (feature) films, writing a number of screenplays for feature films, essays on cinema, plays, and carrying out artistic-photographical projects and film workshops. He also found his way into the Faculty of Art and Architecture in Tehran and studied Dramatic literature, but he never finished his studies there. Later he gained admission to the University of Music and Performing Arts, Vienna to continue his studies in cinema and theater, but he was captured by security forces and his passport was seized before setting out for Austria and was barred from taking up academic studies at home and abroad. "People in distance" is the name of a black and white photography project implemented by Hossein Rajabian.

Filmography

Short 
So So (fiction, 2003, 6 minutes)
Navigation (documentary, 2005, 43 minutes)
To Revolution Square (documentary, 2006, 22 minutes)
Some Redundant Word in The Dictionary (fiction, 2010, 20 minutes)
Lines (documentary, 2010 to present)

Film Workshop 
Film Workshop The Experimental & Creatively attitude

Photography project 
People in distance is the name of a black and white photography project implemented by Hossein Rajabian.

Feature film scripts 
The stone falls in water (2009)
The Upside-down Triangle (2011)
Creation between Two Surfaces (2019)

Feature 
The Upside-down Triangle (fiction, 2016, 106 minutes)Creation between Two Surfaces (fiction, 2019, 95 minutes) Apprehension and court case 
After finishing his first feature film, Rajabian was arrested by Iranian security forces on 5 October 2013 outside his office in Sari alongside two musicians, and was transferred to Ward 2-A of Evin Prison where all three of them were held in solitary confinement for more than two months and were threatened with televised confessions. He was released on bail (around $166,000) in mid-December, pending trial. Two years later, his case was heard at Branch 28 of Tehran Revolutionary Court which was presided over by Judge Moghisseh (Summer 2015). He was sentenced to six years in prison and fines for pursuing illegal cinematic activities, launching propaganda against the establishment and hurling insults at sanctities. On appeal, his sentence was changed to three years imprisonment and three years of suspended jail and fines.

 Imprisonment and hunger strike 
Hossein Rajabian was sent to the ward 7 of Evin Prison in Tehran. After spending one third of his total period of imprisonment (that is 11 months), he went on hunger strike to protest against unjust trial, lack of medical facilities, and transfer of his brother to another ward called section 8 of the same prison. During the first hunger strike period, which lasted 14 days, he was transferred to hospital because of pulmonary infection and he could not continue his hunger strike because of the interference of the representative of the prosecutor who was sent as an intermediary. After some time, he sent an open letter to the judicial authorities of Iran and went again on strike which brought him the support of international artists. After 36 days of hunger strike, he could convince the judicial authorities of Iran to review his case and grant him medical leave for the treatment of his left kidney suffered from infections and blood arising out of hunger strike. he, after a contentious struggle with the judicial officer of the prison was sent to the ward 8 for punishment. After spending three years in Evin prison, he was finally released from Evin Prison under pressure from the world media and the reaction of human rights organizations around the world.

 Official reactions of the senior officials of the world 
After imprisonment of Hossein Rajabian, senior officials of the world started to react officially to this sentence. For instance, Ban Ki-moon, secretary general of the United Nations, issued a special declaration about the human rights in the world. In the ninth page of the annual declaration, he refers to the conditions of Hossein Rajabian in the Iranian prisons, and asks the Iranian authorities to release this filmmaker unconditionally. UN Special Rapporteur for human rights in Iran Asma Jahangir, in her annual report called for the unconditional release of Hossein Rajabian and other prisoners in Iran. It can be referred to the protesting speech delivered by Wilfred Moore, the Canadian Liberal Senator in the senate against the Iranian authorities and in support of Hossein Rajabian. After the imprisonment of Hossein Rajabian, Åse Kleveland who is a Norwegian an artist and political leader declared her support to him, and asked for unconditional release of him and all artists imprisoned throughout the world. Following that, Philip Luther, the head of Amnesty International published an official video talking about Hossein Rajabian and asked all artists of the world to launch a worldwide campaign to support him. After organizing an international petition by the Amnesty International, Johnny Depp, the American actor, and Peter Gabriel, the well-known musician initiated a campaign with the motto "Art is not a Crime" to protest against censorship and support Rajabian and all other imprisoned artists.

A petition was signed by more than 12,000 people of different human right activists and artists addressing the Iranian authorities to review the judicial case of Rajabian and several other prisoners. Finally, the United Nations Human Rights Committee unanimously passed a resolution against Iranian government for the flagrant violation of human rights as a reaction to the collective hunger strike of Hossein Rajabian and seven other political and ideological prisoners of Evin Prison. Following that, the United States Senate extended the sanctions imposed on Iran for the violation of human rights for another ten years. The citizens of European countries initiated a supporting campaign and a sit-in in front of the Iranian Embassies in different countries while showing his photos. The annual report U.S. Department of State on Human Rights in Iran in 2016 cited the situation of prisoner filmmaker Hossein Rajabian.

 Film release in protest 
In protest at his sentence and seizure of his film materials, Hossein Rajabian released the medium-quality copy of his film  The Upside-down Triangle online. Creation between Two Surfaces'' his second film is in line with Iranian popular protests which culminated in November 2019, and was released on the internet for free in February 2020,  as a show against censorship and in sympathy with the protesting people.

Media reaction to court sentence 

The news on the imprisonment of Hossein Rajabian, the Iranian artist, had globally great worldwide reflection, and it was covered by many news agencies including Washington Post, Guardian,Independent, Al-Arabiya, BBC, Le Figaro, CNN, Al Jazeera etc. The arrest and conviction of Hossein Rajabian was given extensive coverage by media outlets in Iran and other countries.In an exclusive interview, Amnesty International's Deputy Director for the Middle East and North Africa Said Boumedouha expressed objection to Rajabian's sentence. Afterwards, Amnesty International launched a global campaign and petition calling on all artists across the world to sign the petition and join the campaign. More than 20,000 artists from four corners of the world joined the campaign, chief among them musician-turned-actor Jared Leto, an Oscar winning actor, and Ai Weiwei, a Chinese contemporary artist and activist, Reza Deghati Iranian Photographer, keyhan kalhor Iranian musician, Nazanin Bonyadi Iranian-British Actress, Shirin Neshat Iranian-American Artist, Nasrin soutodeh Iranian activist & Lawyer, Bahman Ghobadi Kordish-Iranian Director, Shirin Ebadi Nobel Peace Prize winner and Jafar Panahi Iranian Director By Take Video and who released the news on their Twitter & Instagram and Facebook pages.

Earlier, other institutions such as PEN International, International Campaign for Human Rights [in Iran], European Council of Artists (ECA), the European Composer and Songwriter Alliance, Freemuse [Freedom of Musical Expression], etc. simultaneously released a statement calling on Iranian authorities to release Rajabian. In another move, as many as 165 individuals involved in media and cinema activities in Iran and foreign countries sent a letter to Minister of Culture and Islamic Guidance Ali Jannati, and UN Special Rapporteur for human rights in Iran Ahmed Shaheed, in his annual report called for the unconditional release of Hossein Rajabian and two other prisoners.

Awards and nominations 
 The Global Investigative Journalism Network's Choice Award as Rebellion's Artist in the World 2017
 CoR Award 2022

See also
 Culture of Iran
 Islamic art
 Iranian art
 Iranian art and architecture
 List of Iranian artists

References

Sources and external links

 Hossein Rajabian Official Website
 washington post
 Culture action europe
 International Film Festival Clermont
 The 10 Best Iranian Films of 2015
 ZH Magazine
 Hossein Rajabian youtube Channel
 Amnesty International
 washington post
 International Campaign for Human Rights in Iran
 culture action europe
 The Independent
 The Global Investigative Journalism Network
 Coverage by The Guardian of Hossein Rajabian’s sentence
 Coverage by The Winterswijkse Weekkrant of Hossein Rajabian sentence
Coverage by PEN International of Hossein Rajabian’s sentence
 Coverage by Freemuse (165 Iranian artists and activists protest charges against two musicians and a filmmaker)
 Covereage by El Espanol of Hossein Rajabian's sentence
 Covereage by CNN Arabic
 Covereage by AL JAZEERA Arabic
 International Film Festival Clermont
 The 10 Best Iranian Films of 2015
 Hossein Rajabian youtube Channel

Artist authors
Feminist filmmakers
Iranian documentary film directors
Persian-language writers
Iranian dramatists and playwrights
Iranian theatre directors
Iranian cinematographers
Iranian art directors
Iranian artists
Iranian photographers
Iranian film editors
Iranian documentary film producers
Documentary film editors
Iranian experimental filmmakers
1984 births
Living people
Iranian directors
Iranian filmmakers
People convicted of spreading propaganda against the system by the Islamic Republic of Iran
Persian-language film directors
People from Tehran
Iranian film producers
Iranian screenwriters
Amnesty International people
Amnesty International prisoners of conscience held by Iran
Inmates of Evin Prison